Bromelia palmeri is a plant species in the genus Bromelia. This species is endemic to southwestern Mexico, from Colima south to Oaxaca.

References

palmeri
Endemic flora of Mexico
Plants described in 1896